Stephen Stanley Sternberg (July 30, 1920 – May 12, 2021) was an American surgical pathologist, who worked at the Memorial Sloan-Kettering Cancer Center for his entire career.

He was well known because of his editorship of two widely used reference books in anatomical pathology (Diagnostic Surgical Pathology [now Sternberg's Diagnostic Surgical Pathology] and Histology for Pathologists).  He was also the founding Editor-in-Chief of The American Journal of Surgical Pathology, a position he held for 24 years, and an expert in colorectal neoplasia.

Biography
Sternberg was a native of Queens, New York, and was educated at Colby College, Waterville, Maine (B.S., class of 1941) and New York University School of Medicine (M.D., class of 1947). He subsequently completed postgraduate training in pathology at Charity Hospital, New Orleans, LA and the Memorial Sloan-Kettering Cancer Center in New York City. Dr. Sternberg joined the attending staff of the latter institution in 1951, and rose through the ranks of the Cornell University faculty to become Professor of Pharmacology & Experimental Therapeutics.

He died in May 2021 at the age of 100.

Research
In addition to his work in hospital-based surgical pathology, Dr. Sternberg had a prolific career as an experimental pathologist. His research topics included the toxicity of antineoplastic agents in laboratory animals, and the carcinogenic potential of selected chemical compounds in vertebrate organisms.

Work as a Consultant
Dr. Sternberg has been an advisor or consultant to several national and international medical organizations. Those include the U.S. Department of Health, Education, and Welfare; the U.S. Food & Drug Administration; the U.S. Environmental Protection Agency; the World Health Organization; the New York Science Policy Association; the American Council on Health & Science; the National Science Foundation; the Association for the Advancement of Medical Instrumentation; and the Dutch Cancer Society.

References 

1920 births
2021 deaths
American centenarians
American male writers
American pathologists
Colby College alumni
Men centenarians
People from Queens, New York
Scientists from New York (state)